Vismara is an Italian surname. Notable people with the surname include:

Clement Vismara (1897–1988), Italian priest and missionary
Giorgio Vismara (born 1965), Italian judoka
Lorenzo Vismara (born 1975), Italian swimmer

Italian-language surnames